Minsmere–Walberswick Heaths and Marshes are a Special Area of Conservation and Site of Special Scientific Interest in the English county of Suffolk. The site is also designated as a Special Protection Area, part of the Minsmere–Walberswick European Marine Site and contains areas designated as Ramsar sites and Natura 2000 sites. It lies within the Suffolk Coast and Heaths Area of Outstanding Natural Beauty and is made up of a "complex mosaic" of marshes, reed beds, shingle banks and lowland heath habitats.

It is a composite site and was formed by the almagamation of the Minsmere Level, Walberswick and Brick Kiln Walks SSSI units. It extends from Hen Reedbeds and Southwold Common north of the River Blyth, through Walberswick and Dunwich to Westleton, Minsmere and Eastbridge to the north of Sizewell nuclear power stations. The area includes the Suffolk Coast National Nature Reserve sites at Hen Reedbeds, Walberswick and Dingle Marshes, the National Trust property at Dunwich Heath and the Minsmere RSPB reserve. It is a Nature Conservation Review site, Grade I, and covers two nature reserves managed by the Suffolk Wildlife Trust, Dingle Marshes and Hen Reedbeds.

Special Area of Conservation
This area includes a range of habitats, including lowland heath and shingle beach vegetation.

References

See also
 List of Sites of Special Scientific Interest in Suffolk

Sites of Special Scientific Interest in Suffolk
Marshes of England
Special Protection Areas in England
Special Areas of Conservation in England
Nature Conservation Review sites
Ramsar sites in England